Hanchuan railway station is a railway station located in Hanchuan, Xiaogan, Hubei Province, People's Republic of China, on the Wuhan–Yichang railway, operated by China Railway Wuhan Group. It opened on 1 July 2012.

Nearby stations

Hankou railway station (Wuhan)
Tianmen South railway station (Tianmen)

References

Railway stations in Hubei
Railway stations in China opened in 2012